Cedrick David Brown (born September 6, 1964) is an American pastor and former football cornerback who played one season in the National Football League (NFL) for the Philadelphia Eagles. He appeared in 12 games during the 1987 season.

Early life and education
Brown was born on September 6, 1964 in Compton, California, and grew up there. He was the son of a Baptist minister and was one of eight children. He attended Compton High School and was rated the state's top prep cornerback as a senior in 1981. Brown accepted a scholarship offer from Washington State University (WSU) in 1982. He was a four-year letterman and for three years was a starter at defensive back, finishing his stint at the school with 166 tackles and three interceptions. He majored in hotel and restaurant management at WSU and graduated in 1986.

Professional career
After going unselected in the NFL Draft, Brown was signed by the Philadelphia Eagles as an undrafted free agent in May 1986. He was placed on injured reserve on August 20, with a sore hamstring. He was eligible to come off the list and join the active roster in November, but a team rules violation led coach Buddy Ryan to have Brown remain on the list for the rest of the season. In , he received a spot on the final roster as a backup cornerback, and made his NFL debut in week one against the Washington Redskins. Brown went on to play in 12 games during the season, only missing three during the players' strike. He recorded one interception return for nine yards, one sack, one punt return for –1 yard and one kick return for 13 yards, as the Eagles compiled a record of 7–8, missing the playoffs. In , Brown battled Izel Jenkins for a spot on the final roster, with Jenkins winning.

Later life
After being released by the Eagles, Brown had a brief stint with Hyatt and Marriott Corporation. Afterwards, he served 15 years with Alcoa, being in sales and executive sales management and managing 33 states and over $500,000,000 in sales. Brown went into deep prayer after his time in professional football, and was a founder of Commitment Community Church in New Jersey in 1996. He quit his job at Alcoa in 2006 to become their full-time lead pastor, and has served there since. He has published several books (listed below). Brown is married and has three children.

Works

(with Colon, Norberto; Davis, Gerard) 

(with Ott, Josh)

References

1964 births
Living people
American football cornerbacks
Players of American football from Compton, California
Compton High School alumni
Washington State Cougars football players
Philadelphia Eagles players
Christian religious leaders